is a Japanese manga series written and illustrated by Saisō. It has been serialized in Takeshobo's Storia Dash website since April 2020, with its chapters collected into five tankōbon volumes as of October 2022. An anime television series adaptation by Project No.9 is set to premiere in July 2023.

Characters

Media

Manga
Written and illustrated by Saisō, Uchi no Kaisha no Chiisai Senpai no Hanashi began serialization in Takeshobo's  website on April 3, 2020. The first tankōbon volume was released on October 30, 2020. As of October 2022, five volumes have been released.

Volume list

Anime
An anime television series adaptation was announced on October 17, 2022. It is produced by Project No.9 and directed by Mitsutoshi Satō, with scripts written by Keiichirō Ōchi, Yasuko Aoki, and Satoru Sugizawa, character designs handled by Hayato Hashiguchi and Hiromi Ogata, and music composed by Sumika Horiguchi. The series is set to premiere in July 2023.

Reception
In 2020, the manga ranked 11th in the Next Manga Awards in the web manga category.

See also
She's My Knight, another manga series by Saisō

References

External links
  
  
 

2023 anime television series debuts
Anime series based on manga
Japanese webcomics
Project No.9
Romantic comedy anime and manga
Takeshobo manga
Upcoming anime television series
Webcomics in print